Birgül is a feminine Turkish name meaning "one rose", and it may refer to:

Given name
 Birgül Oğuz (born 1981), Turkish writer.
 Birgül Sadıkoğlu (born 2000), Turkish women's footballer

Surname
 Refika Birgül (born 1980), Turkish female food writer

Turkish feminine given names